Meredith Rae Mauldin (née Thompson), known professionally by her stage name Meredith McCoy, is an American actress and singer best known as the English voice of Android #18 in the Japanese anime Dragon Ball series as dubbed by Funimation. She also voiced Kagura Sohma in Fruits Basket (2001), Maria Ross in Fullmetal Alchemist, and Atsuko Urameshi in Yu Yu Hakusho.

Biography
McCoy was born Meredith Rae Thompson. She is the step-daughter of the late Jaan Kalmes, a long-time radio personality in the Dallas/Fort Worth area and Rebecca Kalmes. She has 3 brothers (Andy, Paul and Isaac) and 2 sisters (Caroline and Elizabeth).

McCoy graduated from Collin County Community College and attended with fellow voice actor Laura Bailey. In 2005, McCoy married Michael Mauldin, a former Texas Senate candidate and executive director of worship ministry UpperRoom. She and Mauldin have three children together: Ellia, Jonathan and Noah.

Acting
McCoy's voice acting career began as Android #18 in the anime, Dragon Ball Z. She has also been the voice for several other anime characters including Kagura Sohma in Fruits Basket, Maria Ross in Fullmetal Alchemist, Kari Simmons in Case Closed and Lu Li Chang in Blue Gender.

McCoy has also acted in several films including: Graduation Day (2003), Saving Jessica Lynch (2003), The Deadbeat Club (2004), Life Is Not a Fairytale: The Fantasia Barrino Story (2006) and The Imposter (2008). McCoy was also featured in the Kenny Chesney music video for "There Goes My Life".

Music
McCoy began her singing career as part of the singing group, Paper Dolls. She has sung with the Cary Richards orchestra, traveled all over the U.S. with Vince Vance and the Valiants, and has performed with Ricky Derek's Night 'Oh' Cabaret. She performed with Corner Pocket, a six-piece jazz/swing band based in Dallas, Texas, as a lead female vocalist and released their album, On Cue.

In 2008, McCoy released her debut album, Releasing Angels. Her song, Empty, was featured in the film, The Imposter. McCoy was featured on the opening theme song ‘Believe’ for the Funimation English dub of One Piece, Episodes 48-116. She has also been featured on several of The Upper Room's albums as a featured singer and previously sang with The Glory of Zion International Worship Team.

Filmography

Anime
 Blue Gender – Lu Li Chang, Su Li Chang
 Burst Angel – Yoko (Ep. 5-6)
 Case Closed – Kari Simmons (Ep. 6), Mazy Mitchel (Ep. 43), Suzu Mikami (Ep. 63-64)
 Dragon Ball – Launch
 Dragon Ball GT – Android #18
 Dragon Ball Super – Android #18
 Dragon Ball Z – Android #18, Launch
 Dragon Ball Z: Battle of Gods – Android #18
 Dragon Ball Z: Resurrection 'F' – Android #18
 Dragon Ball Super: Super Hero – Android #18
 Fruits Basket (2001) – Kagura Sohma, Mai Gotou
 Fullmetal Alchemist – Maria Ross, Kyle (Ep. 9)
 Fullmetal Alchemist: Brotherhood – Maria Ross
 The Galaxy Railways – Karen (Ep. 4)
 Gunslinger Girl – Patricia (Ep. 8)
 Gunslinger Girl -Il Teatrino- – Patricia (Ep. 5, 7)
 Kiddy Grade – Bonita
 Kodocha – Jackie O
 Lupin III – Fujiko Mine
 Rumbling Hearts – Hitomi
 Yu Yu Hakusho – Atsuko Urameshi, Sasuga

Live action
 Graduation Day – Maddie
 Saving Jessica Lynch – Beth
 Midnight Clear – Caroler Gretchen
 The Imposter (2008) – Sydney

Video games
 Dragon Ball series – Android 18 (2002-2009, 2015–present), Launch
 Seven Samurai 20XX - Additional voices
 Spikeout: Battle Street - Additional voices

Discography
Studio Albums
 Releasing Angels (2007) – debut studio album

Albums with Vince Vance & The Valiants
 We Don't Run (2003)

Albums with CornerPocket
 On Cue (2004)

Albums with The Glory of Zion International Worship Team
 Freed to Enter the Glory Realm (2010)
 Descending into Triump (2010)
 Contending for a New Beginning (2010)

Albums with The Upper Room
 God You Are (2014)
 Live from Upper Room (2016)
 Center of Your Love (2017)
 Moments (2018)
 To the One. Joy. (2018)

Anime song covers
 Android #18 – character song found on Dragon Ball Z American Soundtrack : Android 18 – The Android Sagas
 Daydream Generation – 5th ending theme song for Yu Yu Hakusho
 Believe – 2nd opening theme song for One Piece
 For Fruits Basket – English dub of opening theme song for Fruits Basket (2001)

References

External links
Official Corner Pocket Site
  (archive) 

Living people
Actresses from Texas
American film actresses
American performers of Christian music
American video game actresses
American voice actresses
Singers from Texas
21st-century American singers
21st-century American women singers
Year of birth missing (living people)